Muhammad Ahmad ’Ali al-Isawi, known as Abu Osama al-Masri (1972/1973-June 2018) was an Egyptian jihadist and leader of the Islamic State branch in the Sinai Peninsula, known as Wilayat Sinai.

History
Abu Osama is believed to have been born in North Sinai and grew up in Sharqiya in the Nile Delta. His kunya means 'father of Osama, the Egyptian'.

He was said to be 42 years old as of November 2015, making his birth year 1972 or 1973. He is reported to have been a clothing importer who studied at al-Azhar University, a top Sunni institution in Cairo.

In October 2014, he was believed to have traveled to Syria with about 20 followers when security forces clamped down on militants after former Egyptian President Mohamed Morsi was deposed in the 2013 Egyptian coup d'état.

Abu Osama was a member of Ansar Bait al-Maqdis, the previous name of the Islamic State's Sinai branch.

Islamic State in Sinai
For much of his time in the group he served as head media spokesman.

In May 2015 a recording surfaced where Abu Osama called for attacks against Egyptian judges, saying: "It is wrong for the tyrants [judges] to jail our brothers. Poison their food... surveil them at home and in the street... destroy their homes with explosives if you can."

In November 2015, he became a person of interest in the downing of Metrojet Flight 9268. He claimed responsibility, saying "We are the ones who downed it [Metrojet Flight 9268] by the grace of Allah, and we are not compelled to announce the method that brought it down."

He became leader of Wilayah Sinai in August 2016. An Islamic State - Sinai Province video titled "The Path of Rationality From Darkness to Light" claimed he was killed in June 2018 during an airstrike at an Islamic State location.

References

Islamic State of Iraq and the Levant members from Egypt
Sinai insurgency
Al-Azhar University alumni
Leaders of Islamic terror groups
Salafi jihadists
1973 births
2018 deaths
Egyptian Islamists
People from North Sinai Governorate